Dreamboat Annie Live is a live DVD released by the American rock band Heart in October 2007, which features Heart performing all ten songs from their 1976 debut album, Dreamboat Annie, plus five extra performances. The concert was also broadcast on DirecTV. The concert soundtrack was released as a live album, with the UK edition containing two bonus live tracks.

The DVD is the first in the Shout! Factory's "Legendary Albums Live" series.

Track listing
All songs by Ann Wilson and Nancy Wilson, except where indicated

"Magic Man" - 5:52
"Dreamboat Annie (Fantasy Child)"  - 1:23
"Crazy on You" - 4:42
"Soul of the Sea" - 6:34
"Dreamboat Annie" - 2:48
"White Lightning and Wine" - 3:38
"(Love Me Like Music) I'll Be Your Song" - 3:38
"Sing Child" (A. Wilson, N. Wilson, Roger Fisher, Steve Fossen) - 4:15
"How Deep It Goes" (A. Wilson) - 4:31
"Dreamboat Annie (Reprise)" - 4:15
"Mistral Wind" (A. Wilson, N. Wilson, Sue Ennis, Fisher) - 8:24
"Goodbye Blue Sky" (Roger Waters) - 3:54
"Black Dog" (John Paul Jones, Jimmy Page, Robert Plant) - 4:51
"Misty Mountain Hop" (Jones, Page, Plant) - 5:01
"Love, Reign o'er Me" (Pete Townshend) - 6:54

British CD release bonus tracks
"Love Alive" (A. Wilson, N. Wilson, Fisher) - 4:52
"Isolation" (John Lennon) - 4:12

Reviews
The album was favourably reviewed. At AllMusic, Andrew Leahey said "For those fans who prefer Heart's early material to the slick, hairsprayed singles of the '80s, Dreamboat Annie Live is a reminder that this band did – and, indeed, does – rock the boat."

Personnel

Heart
Ann Wilson – lead vocals, flute, percussion
Nancy Wilson - rhythm guitar, 12-string guitar, harmonica, vocals, percussion, audio producer
Craig Bartock – lead guitar, banjo, backing vocals, audio producer
Debbie Shair - keyboards
Ric Markmann – bass, didjeridu
Ben Smith – percussion, drums, tympani

Additional musicians
Darian Sahanaja – percussion, sound effects, vocals, vocal arrangement, string arrangements, string conductor
Andreas Forsman – violin
Lena Bergström, Anna Landberg Dager - cellos
Jeffrey Foskett, Libby Torrance - backing vocals

CD production
Shawn Amos, Bob Emmer – series producers
Jeff Palo, Carol Peters – producers
Stewart Whitmore – digital editing
Stephen Marcussen – mastering
Emily Johnson – artwork, package supervision
Robert Y. Kim – project assistant

References and notes 

Heart (band) live albums
2007 live albums
Shout! Factory live albums
2007 video albums
Shout! Factory video albums
Live video albums